Bryan Hall (born August 19, 1934) nicknamed "Hallsy", is a Canadian radio and television personality and retired radio play-by-play broadcaster for the Edmonton Eskimos on 630 CHED in Edmonton, Alberta.

Career
Hall was born on August 19, 1934 in Toronto, Ontario. His father was a lawyer, who died when Hall was 9, and his mother a nurse. Hall got his first broadcasting job at the age of 19, after moving to Edmonton, at CKUA where he did news, a jazz show, and sports. At the suggestion of a columnist for the Edmonton Journal, Hall also took up a vacant sportscaster job at CHED, which he held from 1955 to 1962. In 1962, Hall moved to Toronto to take up a job covering sports with CHUM, but moved back to Edmonton 3 years later, this time, back to CJCA, where he did play-by-play for the CFL's Edmonton Eskimos with the network from 1965 to 1993. During his time with CJCA, he also pioneered the first open-line sports talk radio show in Edmonton. In the decade of the 70s, Hall worked as a racetrack announcer at Edmonton Northlands Park calling over 10,000 thoroughbred races. When CJCA ceased broadcasting operations in 1993, Hall moved back to CHED to take up the position of sports director – continuing to do play-by-play of Edmonton Eskimos games until 2009.
After 45 years of play-by-play for Edmonton Eskimos games, Hall retired in 2009. During his play-by-play career, he also did play-by-play for the Edmonton Oilers, Edmonton Oil Kings, and Edmonton Flyers. The media centre, The Bryan Hall Media Centre, in Commonwealth Stadium was named after Hall when he retired in 2009. Though retired from doing play-by-play, Hall, in his 65th year of broadcasting, currently does 14 daily shows in the morning on CHED, I News and Global Television.  Hall is also known for doing radio advertisements on CHED for local Christenson Developments, Crosstown Motors, and Lay-z-boy Furniture He was inducted into the Canadian Football Hall of Fame in 1989, and the Alberta Sports Hall of Fame in 2004.

Broadcasting positions
CKUA – 1953–55
CHED – 1955–62
CHUM – 1962–65
CJCA – 1965–93
CHED – 1993–current

References

External links

1934 births
Living people
Alberta Sports Hall of Fame inductees
Canadian Football Hall of Fame inductees
Canadian Football League announcers
Canadian radio sportscasters
Edmonton Elks personnel
Edmonton Oilers announcers
Canadian football people from Toronto
World Hockey Association broadcasters